Alasdair Fraser (born 14 May 1955, Clackmannan, Scotland) is a Scottish fiddler, composer, performer and recording artist.

Fraser operates Culburnie Records and is a leading artist on the label.  He has founded five summer fiddling programs: the Valley of the Moon fiddle camp in California (begun in 1984), Alasdair Fraser Skye Week - a week-long course on the Isle of Skye (begun in 1987),  Sierra Fiddle Camp in California (begun in 2006), Crisol de Cuerda, a Trad strings program in Spain begun in 2008 and Stringmania! - a trad strings program in Australia in 2016. Adept in various Scottish idioms, in recent years, with cellist Natalie Haas, he has helped reconstruct and revive the Scottish tradition of playing traditional music on violin and cello ("wee fiddle" and "big fiddle"). Fraser lives in northern California with his wife and two sons.

In December 2011, Fraser was inducted into the Scottish Traditional Music Hall of Fame.

Discography
Portrait of a Scottish Fiddler, Solo album -released 1982
Skyedance, with Paul Machlis (Keyboards, Piano) - released 1985
The Road North, with Paul Machlis (Keyboards, Piano) - released 1987
The Driven Bow, with Jody Stecher (Guitar) - released 1989
Dawn Dance, Solo album - released 1996
Way Out to Hope Street, with Skyedance Band - released 1997
Return to Kintail, with Tony McManus (Guitar) - released 1999
Labyrinth, with Skyedance Band - released 2000
Legacy of the Scottish Fiddle, Vol 1, with Paul Machlis (Piano) and Natalie Haas (Cello) - released 2002
Live in Spain, with Skyedance Band - released 2002
Legacy of the Scottish Fiddle, Vol 2, with Muriel Johnstone (Piano) and Natalie Haas (Cello) - released 2004
Fire and Grace, Alasdair Fraser & Natalie Haas - released 2004 (winner, Scots Trad Album of the Year)
In the Moment, Alasdair Fraser & Natalie Haas - released 2007
Highlander's Farewell, Alasdair Fraser & Natalie Haas - released 2011
Abundance, Alasdair Fraser & Natalie Haas - released 2014
Ports of Call, Alasdair Fraser & Natalie Haas - released 2017
Syzygy, Alasdair Fraser & Natalie Haas - released 2021

Compilation appearances
The Narada Wilderness Collection
Celtic Odyssey (Narada)
Celtic Dance (Narada)
The Narada Nutcracker
Treasure Planet soundtrack (featured soloist, co-composer on "Silver Leaves" (contains "Alasdair Fraser's Compliments to Lorna Mitchell"))

References

External links

concert photos
The new Spanish Fiddle and Cello Camp
Treasure Planet film credits at the Big Cartoon Database

1955 births
Living people
Scottish fiddlers
British male violinists
Narada Productions artists
21st-century violinists
21st-century British male musicians